The Maschinengewehr 1901, or MG 01, was the standard machine gun of the Imperial German Army from its introduction in 1901 to the adoption of its successor, the MG 08, in 1908. After the introduction of the MG 08, the MG 01 was mainly used by German colonial soldiers.

History

Adoption and development 
In Navy Gazette of October 3rd, 1892, Kaiser Wilhelm II approved a supreme cabinet order allowing the introduction of the "8-mm Maxim machine gun into the naval artillery" for cruisers and landing parties, leading to the development and adoption of the MG 99, which was based on the M87 "World Standard" by the army in 1899. The MG 01 added upon the MG 99 by introducing spoked wheels to the sled mount on some models which allowed it to be pushed and pulled.

Service history 
The MG 01 was first used in the Herero Wars by the German Empire against the Herero and Namaqua peoples. Afterwards, at least two MG 01s were exported to Bulgaria where they saw service in the Balkan Wars. By the start of World War I, almost all of the MG 01s and other machine guns considered obsolete had been relegated to machine gun detachments in Germany's colonial possessions where they had started to be replaced by the MG 08. During World War I, it was used by the East and South West African Schutztruppe where it was commonly mounted on tripods and artillery carriages. In the Kiautschou Bay Leased Territory, it was used by the machine gun company of the III. Seebataillon and saw service during the Siege of Tsingtao. After World War I, the MG 01 was used by German soldiers during the Spartacist uprising.

Surviving examples 
There are only 2 known surviving examples of the MG 01. The first is MG 01 No. 206 which was produced in 1902, located in the Bayerisches Armeemuseum in Ingolstadt, Bavaria, it belonged to the III. Bataillon 3. Infanterie Regiment, 1. Maschinengewehr Abteilung, located in Augsburg, Bavaria. The second is MG 01 No. 626 which was produced in 1907 in Berlin, located in the Royal Museum of the Armed Forces and Military History in Brussels, Belgium, it was most likely one of the MG 01s delivered to the navy. Later, during World War I, it was captured by the British Empire.

Users 

 : Used by the Kaiserliche Marine and Deutches Heer from 1901 until a at least 1919.
 : Exported from the German Empire.
 : Exported from the German Empire.
 : Captured from the Germans during WWI.

Gallery

References

External links 
 http://www.mitrailleuse.fr/Allemandes/Mg08/MG08.htm
 https://german1914.com/nov-1-the-beginning-with-sir-hiram-maxims-guns-mg-99-and-mg-01/
 https://german1914.com/nov-8-the-standard-machine-gun-of-the-german-army-mg-08/
 http://germancolonialuniforms.co.uk/hist%20machine%20guns.htm

Machine guns of Germany
Heavy machine guns
Weapons and ammunition introduced in 1901